Bossiaea rhombifolia, is a species of flowering plant in the family Fabaceae and is endemic to eastern Australia. It is an erect, glabrous shrub with diamond-shaped, more or less round or broadly egg-shaped leaves, and yellow and red or pinkish flowers.

Description

Taxonomy
Bossiaea rhombifolia was first formally described in 1825 by Augustin Pyramus de Candolle in Prodromus Systematis Naturalis Regni Vegetabilis from un unpublished description by Franz Sieber. The specific epithet (rhombifolia) means "diamond-shaped", referring to the leaves.

Distribution and habitat
This species of Bossiaea grows in woodland and forest from near Stanthorpe in south-eastern Queensland to 
Wadbilliga National Park near Moruya in south-eastern New South Wales.

References

rhombifolia
Mirbelioids
Flora of New South Wales
Flora of Queensland
Taxa named by Augustin Pyramus de Candolle
Plants described in 1825